The following is a list of the MTV Europe Music Award winners and nominees for Best Southeast Asian Act.

Winners and nominees

2010s

2020s

See also
MTV Asia Awards:
MTV Asia Award for Favorite Artist Indonesia
MTV Asia Award for Favorite Artist Malaysia
MTV Asia Award for Favorite Artist Philippines
MTV Asia Award for Favorite Artist Singapore
MTV Asia Award for Favorite Artist Thailand

References

Southeast Asian Act
Awards established in 2013
Malaysian music awards
Philippine music awards
Indonesian music awards
Singaporean music
Thai music awards
Vietnamese music awards